Witley Military Camp, often simplified to Camp Witley, was a temporary army camp set up on Witley Common, Surrey, England during both the First and Second World Wars.

Camp Witley was one of three facilities in the Aldershot Command area established by the Canadian Army; the others being Bordon and Bramshott (nr. Liphook).

Wilfred Owen penned a prelude to his ‘Anthem for Doomed Youth’ whilst stationed at the camp.

Witley Camp was the headquarters of the Polish Resettlement Corps.

External links 
 Surrey in the Great War
 The Canadian Army Comes to Aldershot

References

Military history of Canada during World War II
Military history of Surrey
Military history of Canada during World War I